Bradford (Park Avenue) A.F.C. is an English semi-professional association football club based in Bradford, West Yorkshire. They were members of the Football League from 1908 to 1970. The following is a list of every Bradford Park Avenue player who appeared in the Football League for the club.

Notes

Sources
Post War English & Scottish Football League A - Z Player's Transfer Database

 
Bradford Park Avenue A.F.C. players
Bradford Park Avenue AFC players
Association football player non-biographical articles